Oleksandr Vasylovych Mantsevych (1 June 1960 – 1 November 2000) was a Ukrainian rower who competed for the Soviet Union in the 1980 Summer Olympics. In 1980 he was a crew member of the Soviet boat which won the bronze medal in the eights event.

References

1960 births
2000 deaths
Ukrainian male rowers
Russian male rowers
Soviet male rowers
Olympic rowers of the Soviet Union
Rowers at the 1980 Summer Olympics
Olympic bronze medalists for the Soviet Union
Olympic medalists in rowing
Medalists at the 1980 Summer Olympics